Lemouya Goudiaby (born 9 January 1997) is a Senegalese professional footballer who plays as a midfielder for French club Voltigeurs de Châteaubriant.

Career
Goudiaby joined FC Metz on 15 August 2016 from the Senegalese club Génération Foot. He signed his first professional contract with Metz on 11 August 2017 after playing 15 matches with the Metz reserves team. He made his professional debut for Metz in a 1–0 Coupe de la Ligue loss to Angers SCO on 12 December 2017.

References

External links
 
 
 

1997 births
Living people
Sportspeople from Thiès
Association football midfielders
Senegalese footballers
Ligue 1 players
Championnat National 2 players
Championnat National 3 players
Belgian National Division 1 players
FC Metz players
A.F.C. Tubize players
Andrézieux-Bouthéon FC players
Voltigeurs de Châteaubriant players
Senegalese expatriate footballers
Senegalese expatriate sportspeople in France
Expatriate footballers in France